Zhonghua Book Company, formerly spelled Chunghwa or Chung-hua Shu-chü, and sometimes translated as Zhonghua Publishing House, are Chinese publishing houses that focuses on the humanities, especially classical Chinese works. Currently it has split into a few separate companies. The main headquarters is in Beijing, while Chung Hwa Book (Hong Kong) is headquartered in Hong Kong. The Taiwan branch is headquartered in Taipei.

History
The company was founded in Shanghai on 1 January 1912 as the Chung Hwa Book Co., Ltd. by Lufei Kui, a former manager of the Commercial Press, another Shanghai-based publisher that had been established in 1897. From the year of its foundation to the birth of the People's Republic of China in 1949, it published about 5,700 titles, excluding reprints.

Zhonghua's punctuated editions of the Twenty-Four Histories have become standard. The publishing project, which started in 1959 on a suggestion by Mao Zedong, was completed in 1977. A revised edition of the entire set integrating the most recent scholarship on the Histories is being prepared.

On December 19, 2011, The China Publishing and Media Holdings Company was founded to become the parent company of the Zhonghua Book Company.

Subsidiaries
Shanghai Zhonghua Printing Co., Ltd.: Originally established in 1912 as Chung Hwa Book Co., Shanghai. In 1966, it was renamed to Zhonghua Printing Factory. In 1988, it was changed into a limited liability company according to the Company Law of the People's Republic of China in 1998. In 2008, Shanghai Zhonghua Printing Co., Ltd. was moved to Qingpu Industrial Park.

Former subsidiaries
Chung Hwa Book Company, Limited: Originally established in 1945 in Taipei, Taiwan. In August 1949, the Chung Hwa Book's Shanghai headquarter was relocated to Taipei. Chung Hwa Book Company, Limited was registered in Hong Kong in 1949-01-20. The Taiwan headquarters was officially separated from the Chung Hwa Book operations in PRC in 1950-10-08. The Taiwanese company was later registered in 1951 in Taiwan, and renamed to Chung Hwa Book Company, Limited in 1952-09-19. The Hong Kong registration was renewed in 1984-08-31 under the old registered names, but with location set to People's Republic of China.
Chung Hwa Book Company (Hong Kong) Limited: Originally established in 1927 in Queen's Road Central, Hong Kong. In 1988, it was renamed to Chung Hwa Book Company (Hong Kong) Limited and re-registered as a subsidiary of Sino United Publishing (Holdings) Limited, with incorporation on 1988-06-16.
Enjoy Time: A branch of Chung Hwa Book Co. (H.K.) Ltd., located in Hong Kong Central Library.
Manga Shop: A branch of Chung Hwa Book Co. (H.K.) Ltd. specializing in Japanese comic books and a dealer of the Japanese chain Animate, located in Mong Kok. Established in 2012, the name was changed to Manga Shop when a prior Animate shop had opened in Hong Kong over a decade ago.
Chung Hwa Book Company (Singapore) Pte Limited: Originally established in 1923, it was incorporated on 27 October 1989 as a limited private company. As of 2016, it is a subsidiary of Sino United Publishing (Holdings) Limited.
Shanghai Lexicographical Publishing House: Founded in August 1958 as Ci Hai Editing Institute under the Beijing company. In January 1978, it was renamed to the current name. As of 2016, it is owned by Shanghai Century Publishing(Group) Co., Ltd.
?: Originally established in 1916 within the Zheng An road factory. In 1925, it was renamed to its current name. In 1935, it was moved into the 4th floor of the newly built Macau factory. Between April and June 1978, it was moved to the Ci Hai Editing Institute building at Shanxi North Road, which was later owned by Shanghai Lexicographical Publishing House.
?: Originally established in 1933 in Pak Tai Street, To Kwa Wan, Kowloon as a printer for CHBC's Hong Kong branch. In 1980, it was merged with ? and ? into C & C Joint Printing Co., (H.K.) Ltd..

Representative publications
Zizhi Tongjian (1956)
Guwen Guanzhi (1959)
Twenty-Four Histories (1959–1977)
The Analects of Confucius, Annotated and Translated (by Yang Bojun, 1980)
Records of the Grand Historian (1982)
The Classic of Poetry, Annotated and Analyzed (by Cheng Junying 程俊英 and Jiang Jianyuan 蔣見元, 1991)
Wang Li Character Dictionary of Ancient Chinese (2000)

References

Citations

Sources
 Works cited

Further reading

External links
Zhonghua Book Company (PRC)
 Chung Hwa Book Company, Limited (by WebTech)
Chung Hwa Book Co. (H.K.) Ltd. (HK)

Book publishing companies of China
Mass media in Shanghai
Mass media in Beijing
Companies based in Beijing
Chinese companies established in 1912